Hugh Riminton is an Australian foreign correspondent, journalist and television news presenter. He is currently national affairs editor and occasional presenter of 10 News First. He previously co-anchored Ten Eyewitness News with Sandra Sully until February 2017.

Early life and education
Born in Sri Lanka, where his father managed tea estates, Riminton migrated to New Zealand when he was five. He began work as a cadet reporter aged 17 in Christchurch, before moving to Australia in 1983 to work for the Macquarie Radio Network in Perth and Melbourne.

Riminton graduated with a master's degree from Macquarie University with a major work focusing on peacekeeping policy.

Career
Riminton joined the Australian Nine Network as a Melbourne-based general reporter in 1989. He became its London-based correspondent in 1991.

Riminton has reported from more than 40 countries, notably South Africa, Uganda, South Sudan, Somalia, Rwanda, the Middle East, Russia, Afghanistan, Pakistan, India, South East Asia, East Timor, China, the United States and the Pacific Islands. He has received several honours for his reporting work, including a Logie Award (1996) for coverage of Tahiti's independence movement and a Walkley Award for his coverage of the 2000 Fijian coup d'état. He was also a Walkley Awards finalist for reportage in Papua New Guinea (1998), Kosovo (1999), Southern Sudan (1999) and Iraq (2003).

In 2001, he was appointed full-time presenter of the Nine Network's national evening news program Nightline, where he remained until joining CNN in December 2004. From Sri Lanka, he reported and presented during CNN's Alfred Dupont Award-winning coverage of the 2004 Boxing Day tsunami. He also reported extensively from Iraq, Pakistan, China, Indonesia, Thailand, the Philippines and elsewhere during this time. 

From January 2005 until September 2008, he co-anchored CNN Today with Kristie Lu Stout out of Hong Kong. During that time, the programme twice won the Asian Television Award for Asia-Pacific's Best News Programme.

Riminton left CNN in 2009, to take up a position as senior political correspondent for Australia's Ten News. He hosted a Sunday morning show, Meet the Press, where he interviewed political leaders. He is also an occasional guest presenter on the Network Ten's prime time alternative news programmeThe Project.

In November 2010, Riminton was appointed as Ten News political editor and bureau chief in Canberra with Paul Bongiorno becoming national affairs editor. In 2011, he gained a second Walkley Award for his work, with reporter Matt Moran, in breaking the "Skype Scandal" in the Australian Defence Force, prompting more than half a dozen police and government inquiries. That year the pair received awards from the United Nations Association and the Australian Human Rights Commission for their work. They were shortlisted for the Graham Perkin Australian Journalist of the Year Award.  In 2013, Riminton hosted current affairs program Revealed on Network Ten.

In February 2014, Network Ten appointed Riminton as anchor of Ten Eyewitness News in Sydney with Sandra Sully. He co-anchored the bulletin until February 2017 when Sully took over as solo presenter.

In August 2020, Riminton commenced as occasional presenter of the Brisbane 10 News First bulletin, after the network consolidated production of bulletins for all cities to Melbourne (for Melbourne and Adelaide) and Sydney (for Sydney, Brisbane and Perth).

Other roles and activities 
He is actively involved in Australian Defence veterans' welfare issues and was a foundation board member of the charity Soldier On. He also was foundation chair of the John Mac Foundation, founded by 2017 NSW Australian of the Year, Deng Adut. Its primary work is funding university scholarships for Australian students from refugee backgrounds. Riminton is a member of the advisory board of Media Diversity Australia and is on the board of the Crescent Institute, a Sydney-based think tank.

In 2017 Hachette Australia published Riminton's autobiography, Minefields: A life in the news game.

Personal life
Riminton was married to Sue Perry from the 1980s to the 1990s.

Natasha Stott Despoja, a leader of the Australian Democrats (served 2001-02) was in a relationship with Riminton until 2001.

In 2004, he moved to Hong Kong with Kumi Taguchi. 

Riminton and Stott Despoja had an unusual reunion in 2013 when they were both on the same panel for The Project coverage of that year's federal election.  

Riminton was a single father when he met journalist Mary Lloyd in early 2007 while working at CNN. In 2009, the family moved to Canberra, Australia, where their son was born. The couple were married in Cambodia in 2010. Their daughter was born in 2011.

References

1961 births
Nine News presenters
10 News First presenters
Australian television journalists
Living people
Macquarie University alumni
New Zealand television journalists
New Zealand emigrants to Australia
New Zealand expatriates in Hong Kong
New Zealand expatriates in the United Kingdom
Sri Lankan people of Australian descent